A number of motor vessels have been named MV Balmoral, including:

 , an excursion ship
 , a cruise ship

Ship names